Henri Thiolière (March 29, 1922 – September 29, 2012) was a French ski jumper who competed in the early 1950s. He finished 43rd in the individual large hill event at the 1952 Winter Olympics in Oslo.

External links
Olympic ski jumping results: 1948-60

References

Olympic ski jumpers of France
Ski jumpers at the 1952 Winter Olympics
French male ski jumpers
2012 deaths
1922 births